Cannabis in Lesotho is illegal for any use, but largely tolerated.  Cannabis is widely produced in the country, being the nation's most significant cash-crop. In the 2000s it was estimated that 70% of the cannabis in South Africa originated in Lesotho.   In 2017 Lesotho became the first African nation to grant a license for the cultivation of medical cannabis.

Cannabis is known as "matekoane" in Sesotho language.

History
Cannabis use dates back to at least the 16th century in Lesotho, when the Koena people traded cannabis to the local San tribes in exchange for land around 1550. By the 19th century, cannabis was a staple crop in the kingdom.

Cultivation
Cannabis is cultivated almost everywhere in Lesotho, including the capital, but the primary cultivation is in the central mountain zones and western foothills.

Medical cannabis
In 2017, the Lesotho Ministry of Health licensed a South African firm to grow cannabis in Lesotho for medical and scientific purposes, the first such authorized establishment in Africa.

In late 2017/early 2018, the Lesotho government licensed 5 companies to produce medical marijuana.  Three of these companies have been partially, or entirely acquired by established licensed Canadian producers: 

 Verve Dynamics - roughly 30% ownership by Aphria (Canada)
 MediGrow Lesotho - 10% acquired by Supreme Cannabis (Canada)
 Daddy-Cann - 100% acquired by Canopy Growth (Canada)
 Medi-Kingdom - 100% owned Medi-Kingdom (UK)
 Pharmaceuticals Development Corp (PDC) - Now owned by Corix (US)
Bophelo Bioscience and Wellness PTY - 20% acquired by Halo Labs Inc (Canada)
WeGROW Medical Cannabis Lesotho- 80% owned by ASIF420 (Israel)

Enforcement
In one joint South African-Lesotho operation in 2006, 47 tons of cannabis were seized.  Cultivation is for the most part tolerated, however, due to the high rate of poverty in the nation and the economic benefits that the cannabis trade provides.

Legislation
In 2001, Lesotho drafted the Drugs of Abuse Bill, which brought Lesotho into line with numerous international drugs law standards, including the 1961 Single Convention on Narcotic Drugs.

References

Further reading

Bloomer, J. (2009). Using a political ecology framework to examine extra-legal livelihood strategies: a Lesotho-based case study of cultivation of and trade in cannabis. Journal of Political Ecology, 16(1), 49–69.

Lesotho
Society of Lesotho
Politics of Lesotho